Michael Campion may refer to:
 Michael Campion (footballer) (born 1984), Filipino-Hong Kong football midfielder
 Michael Campion (musician), American songwriter, music producer and entrepreneur
 Michael A. Campion, professor of management
 Michael Campion (born 2002), American actor who played Jackson Fuller in Fuller House